The British Furniture Confederation (BFC) is a lobby group that represents the furniture and bed making industries of the United Kingdom. It ensures that the views of its members are heard by Parliamentarians and government Ministers and is active in Westminster working on behalf of the industry.

Structure

The BFC was founded in 2006 under the chairmanship of Martin Jourdan. It brought together an alliance of trade associations and unions to speak with a single voice to government. The BFC’s founder members included the British Contract Furnishers Association/ Office Furniture Manufacturers Association (BCFA/OFFMA), British Furniture Manufacturers (BFM), ProSkills, the Furniture Industry Research Association (FIRA), the National Bed Federation (NBF), the Worshipful Company of Furniture Makers (WCFM), the Association of Master Upholsterers & Soft Furnishers (AMUSF), and the General & Municipal Boilermakers Union.

After restructuring in the summer of 2008 its slimmed down Executive Board became responsible for the daily decision making of the group. The Board now consists of Chairman Martin Jourdan, Jessica Alexander (NBF), Roger Mason (BFM), Hayden Davies (FIRA) and Peter Smith (BCFA). The BFC’s Company Secretary is Pete Beele (FIRA). 

The Executive meets in London every two months to discuss issues of concern facing the industry. Along with consultants from public affairs firm PoliticsDirect they plan the BFC’s response to government announcements, initiatives and legislation, as well as general political issues affecting the industry.

Issues of interest

The BFC seeks to lobby the government on a number of issues affecting the furniture industry.  It has met with Government Ministers, their relevant Shadows and Members of Parliament from across the political spectrum to lobby on a wide range of issues, such as access to European Union Funding, procurement of furniture, skills provision, and business support for the UK furniture industry.

All Party Parliamentary Furniture Group

The BFC is a prominent member of the All-Party Parliamentary Group on Furniture, an association of MPs, Lords and industry representatives who seek to promote the sector within Westminster. The Furniture Group is chaired by Madeleine Moon MP (Bridgend) and meets on a twice monthly basis in the House of Commons when Parliament is sitting. 

The group questions senior politicians on policy related to the industry, such as the Rt Hon Angela Eagle MP (Financial Secretary at HM Treasury); the Rt Hon Stephen Timms MP (Minister of State at the Department for Business, Enterprise and Regulatory Reform); and key stakeholders, such as Ian Harrison from the East Midlands Regional Development Authority. In June 2008 the Group hosted a reception and exhibition in the House of Commons to display and celebrate the work of the UK furniture industry.

External links 
The British Furniture Confederation
The GMB Union
British Furniture Manufacturers
ProSkills
FIRA
The National Bed Federation
AMUSF
British Contract Furniture Association
British Furniture Manufacturers

Trade associations based in the United Kingdom